ASOS or Asos may refer to:

 Asos, a village in Greece
 ASOS (retailer), a UK online fashion store
 Association Sportive Oussou Saka, a Beninese football team
 Automated Surface Observing System, a type of weather station
 Air Support Operations Squadron, US Air Force, see List of United States Air Force air support operations squadrons
 A Saucerful of Secrets, the second album by Pink Floyd

 ASOS Brigade, a live-action fictional group to support the English dub release of the Haruhi Suzumiya anime television series.